Georges Oltramare (born 17 April 1896 in Geneva – died 16 August 1960 in Geneva) was a Swiss writer and fascist politician who became involved in collaboration in Nazi-occupied France during World War II.

Born into a leading Geneva family, he obtained a demi-licence in law at the University of Geneva in 1919. He became a noted author, winning the Foundation Schiller prize for his 1927 novel Don Juan ou la Solitude and also wrote for a number of right wing journals, specifically Le Pilori, which specialized in anti-Semitism. He began direct involvement in politics in 1931 when he set up the Ordre politique national, merging this with the Union de Défense économique to form the Union nationale the following year. This fascist movement, which represented the country's French population, gained little support, although Oltramare was invited to participate in the anti-communist Entente nationale genevoise with more conservative parties in 1936. He remained leader of the Union Nationale until 1940 when he left the country to settle in German-occupied France.

Adopting the pseudonym Charles Dieudonné, Oltramare took up his pen in support of the Nazis, eventually becoming director of La France au travail, a German-funded newspaper aimed at converting the country's trade unionists and former communists to the Nazi cause. Also writing for L'Appel and Revivre, as well as broadcasting on Radio Paris, Oltramare even survived an assassination attempt on the Champs-Élysées.

He left France in August 1944 for Sigmaringen, eventually returning to Switzerland in April 1945. Arrested for compromising Switzerland's independence, he spent the next few years in and out detention before being freed in 1952. He went on to live in Spain and Egypt, where he briefly worked as a propagandist for the regime of Gamal Abdel Nasser, before returning to Switzerland where he was allowed to revive Le Pilori, which this time combined Poujadism with anti-Semitism. Notwithstanding a sentence of death that had been passed on him by a French court in 1950 Oltramare died of natural causes in Geneva.

References

1896 births
1960 deaths
Writers from Geneva
Swiss collaborators with Nazi Germany
People sentenced to death in absentia
Swiss fascists
Swiss male novelists
Swiss anti-communists
20th-century Swiss novelists
Officers of the Order of Saints Maurice and Lazarus
20th-century Swiss journalists
Politicians from Geneva